The 2000 FIFA Club World Championship was held in Brazil between 5 January and 14 January 2000. The eight participating teams had to submit squads of 23 players at least 10 days before the start of the tournament. All players were numbered between 1 and 23, regardless of the number they wore in other competitions. Originally, only players registered to their clubs before 15 November 1999 were eligible to play in the tournament, but this cut-off point was later extended to 20 December.

Group A

Corinthians
Head coach:  Oswaldo de Oliveira

Al-Nassr
Head coach:  Milan Živadinović

Raja Casablanca
Head coach:  Fathi Jamal

Real Madrid
Head coach:  Vicente del Bosque

Group B

Manchester United
Head coach:  Alex Ferguson

Necaxa
Head coach:  Raúl Arias

South Melbourne
Head coach:  Ange Postecoglou

Vasco da Gama
Head coach:  Antônio Lopes

References

External links
 

Squads
FIFA Club World Cup squads